The 1957 Syracuse Orangemen football team represented Syracuse University in the 1957 NCAA University Division football season. The Orangemen were led by ninth-year head coach Ben Schwartzwalder and played their home games at Archbold Stadium in Syracuse, New York. Syracuse finished with a record of 5–3–1 and were not invited to a bowl game.

Schedule

References

Syracuse
Syracuse Orange football seasons
Syracuse Orangemen football